The Blue Bridge  is an iron bridge across the River South Tyne at Haltwhistle in Northumberland, England.

History
The Grade II listed bridge was designed by George Gordon Page: it has three arches and wooden decking and was completed in 1875. The bridge was closed to road traffic in 1972 and, having been refurbished in 2003, remains in use for pedestrians. It forms part of National Cycle Route 68, the Pennine Cycleway.

References

Bridges in Northumberland
Crossings of the River Tyne
Haltwhistle